The following is a list of notable individuals who were born in and/or have lived in Garden City, Kansas.

Arts and entertainment
Sanora Babb (1907–2005), novelist, journalist
Jeremy Hubbard (1972– ), news anchor
Frank Mantooth (1947–2004), jazz pianist, arranger
Fred Myton (1885–1955), screenwriter

Law enforcement
Alvin Dewey (1912–1987), special agent of the Kansas Bureau of Investigation

Military
Kendall Carl Campbell (1917–1942), U.S. Naval Reserve aviator

Politics

National
John Cotteral (1864–1933), U.S. federal judge
Clifford R. Hope (1893–1970), U.S. Representative from Kansas
Richard Hopkins (1873–1943), U.S. federal judge
Dale Saffels (1921–2002), U.S. federal judge
William Howard Thompson (1871–1928), U.S. Senator from Kansas

State
Don O. Concannon(1927-2013), Candidate for Governor in 1974.
Roy Romer (1928– ), 39th Governor of Colorado
Jeff Whitham, former member of the Kansas House of Representatives.

Local
Webster Davis (1861–1923), Mayor of Kansas City, Missouri
Buffalo Jones (1844–1919), frontiersman, conservationist, co-founder of Garden City
Chuck Reed (1948– ), 64th Mayor of San Jose, California

Sports

American football
Thurman "Fum" McGraw (1927–2000), NFL defensive tackle
Hal Patterson (1932–2011), CFL wide receiver
John Zook (1947– ), NFL defensive end

Baseball
Gene Krug (1955– ), MLB pinch hitter
 Harry Short (1878–1954), Texas League stolen base leader 1907
Todd Tichenor (1976– ), MLB umpire

Boxing
Victor Ortíz (1987– ), welterweight, actor
Brandon Rios (1986– ), lightweight

Other sports
Mark Fox (1969– ), basketball coach
Ray Watson (1898–1974), U.S. Olympic track and field athlete

Other
 Joe Exotic (1963– ), former zoo operator, convicted felon, and politician
 Charles "Buffalo" Jones (1844–1919), cowboy and naturalist
 Julian Morgenstern (1881–1976), rabbi and Hebrew Union College professor and president

References

Garden City, Kansas
Garden City
People from Garden City, Kansas